Takri Kingdom  or Gori Kingdom was a proto-Korean kingdom where King Dongmyeong, who was the founder of Buyeo, was born.

It is said that Gori Kingdom was located in the north of Buyeo.

Naitō Torajirō pointed out that the Gori Kingdom (where King Dongmyeong, a founder of Buyeo was born) was a country of Daur people who lived by Songhua River.

History 
Gori Kingdom is described in different way by different historical documents. The oldest record of King Dongmyeong, a founder of Buyeo, is in Lunheng of Wang Chong in the later Han dynasty.

In Lunheng, Vol 2, Chapter Jiyan, there's a description of Takri Kingdom .

In Records of the Three Kingdoms, Vol30, Chapter 30 of Book of Wei, Biographics of Wuhuan, Xianbei, and Dongyi, Weilue, there's a description of Gori Kingdom .

Outline 
In Records of the Three Kingdoms, Vol30, Chapter 30 of Book of Wei, Biographics of Wuhuan, Xianbei, and Dongyi, Weilue, there's following descriptions.

References 

Former countries in East Asia
History of Manchuria
History of Korea